Kim Shin-wook (born 14 April 1988) is a South Korean professional footballer who plays as a striker for Hong Kong Premier League club Kitchee.

Club career

Ulsan Hyundai
Kim spent his youth training either as a central defender or a defensive midfielder, but upon suggestion by his manager, he changed his position into a forward a few weeks after signing his first professional contract with Ulsan Hyundai. At first, he struggled to adjust in the new position but lately he has been proving his worth by being one of the top forwards in the Korean football league. His improvement as a striker the last few years is evidenced by his ever-increasing goal scoring record.

Kim was a very influential figure during Ulsan's road to the 2012 AFC Champions League winning title. Kim performed at a top level in all of the 13 matches he played in and ended the tournament with 6 goals scored. With such performance, he was nicknamed as "Attack on Titan" or "Chinook".

Shanghai Shenhua
On 8 July 2019, Kim joined Chinese Super League club Shanghai Shenhua and was reunited with his manager at Jeonbuk Hyundai Motors, Choi Kang-hee. He would make his debut in a league game against Hebei where he also scored his first goal for the club in a 2–1 defeat. After that game Kim quickly established himself as an integral member of the team and he would personally score 10 goals in 15 games as the club moved away from the relegation zone and went on to win the 2019 Chinese FA Cup.

Lion City Sailors
On 15 November 2021, Kim joined Singapore Premier League club Lion City Sailors on a three-year contract reportedly worth more than S$3 million, after his contract at Shanghai had ended. He would make his debut in the 2022 Singapore Community Shield game against Albirex Niigata Singapore where he scored his first goal and brace for the club in a 2–1 win, winning his first silverware with the Sailors in a dream debut.

On 1 April 2022, Kim scored his first hat-trick for the Sailors, as the club cruised to a 4–0 victory against Balestier Khalsa during the 2022 Singapore Premier League season.

On 30 January 2023, Kim departed from Lion City Sailors by mutual consent  amidst criticism of his mobility and cost cutting at parent company Sea Limited

Kitchee
On 2 February 2023, Kim officially joined Hong Kong Premier League club Kitchee on a free transfer, signing a contract until 2026.

International career
Kim was selected for South Korea's squad for the 2014 FIFA World Cup, and showed great performances in aerial duels against Algerian and Belgian players. He was expected to dominate the air in the 2018 FIFA World Cup like in the previous tournament, but failed to exert influence on Swedish defenders.

In October 2014, he and his teammates were awarded with a conscription exemption after winning the gold medal at the 2014 Asian Games.

Personal life
Kim is known to be a devout Christian who reads the bible before games and is nicknamed "church brother" by his teammates. He sometimes participates in evangelizing activities.

Career statistics

Club

International

Scores and results list South Korea's goal tally first, score column indicates score after each Kim goal.

Honours
Ulsan Hyundai
 Korean League Cup: 2011
AFC Champions League: 2012

Jeonbuk Hyundai Motors
K League 1: 2017, 2018
AFC Champions League: 2016

Shanghai Shenhua
Chinese FA Cup: 2019

Lion City Sailors
Singapore Community Shield: 2022

South Korea U23
 Asian Games: 2014

South Korea
AFC Asian Cup third place: 2011
EAFF Championship: 2015, 2017

Individual
 Korean League Cup top goalscorer: 2011
 K League 1 Most Valuable Player: 2013
 K League 1 Best XI: 2013
 K League 1 top goalscorer: 2015
 EAFF Championship top goalscorer: 2017
AFC Champions League All-Star Squad: 2018

References

External links

 Kim Shin-wook – National Team stats at KFA 
 
 Kim Shin-wook at Asian Games Incheon 2014

1988 births
Living people
People from Gwacheon
South Korean footballers
South Korean expatriate footballers
South Korea under-23 international footballers
South Korea international footballers
Ulsan Hyundai FC players
Jeonbuk Hyundai Motors players
K League 1 players
Expatriate footballers in China
South Korean expatriate sportspeople in China
Chinese Super League players
Shanghai Shenhua F.C. players
Expatriate footballers in Singapore
South Korean expatriate sportspeople in Singapore
Singapore Premier League players
Home United FC players
Expatriate footballers in Hong Kong
South Korean expatriate sportspeople in Hong Kong
Hong Kong Premier League players
Kitchee SC players
2011 AFC Asian Cup players
2014 FIFA World Cup players
Chung-Ang University alumni
Footballers at the 2014 Asian Games
Asian Games medalists in football
Asian Games gold medalists for South Korea
Association football forwards
South Korean Christians
Medalists at the 2014 Asian Games
2018 FIFA World Cup players
Sportspeople from Gyeonggi Province